Carbon dating the Dead Sea Scrolls refers to a series of radiocarbon dating tests performed on the Dead Sea Scrolls, first by the AMS (Accelerator Mass Spectrometry) lab of the Zurich Institute of Technology in 1991 and then by the AMS Facility at the University of Arizona in Tucson in 1994–95. There was also a historical test of a piece of linen performed in 1946 by Willard Libby, the inventor of the dating method.

Testing
One of the earliest carbon dating tests was carried out on November 14, 1950. This was on a piece of linen from Qumran Cave 1, the resulting date range being 167 BCE – 233 CE. Libby had first started using the dating method in 1946 and the early testing required relatively large samples, so testing on scrolls themselves only became feasible when methods used in the dating process were improved upon. F.E. Zeuner carried out tests on date palm wood from the Qumran site yielding a date range of 70 BCE – 90 CE. In 1963 Libby tested a sample from the Isaiah Scroll, which provided a range of 200 BCE – 1 CE.

In 1991, Robert Eisenman and Philip R. Davies made a request to date a number of scrolls, which led to a series of tests carried out in Zurich on samples from fourteen scrolls. Among these were samples from other sites around the Dead Sea, which contained date indications within the text to supply a control for the carbon dating results. A similar battery of tests was carried out in 1994–95 in Tucson, this time with samples from twenty-two scrolls as well as another piece of linen.

14C Test results
The following table shows all the Qumran-related samples that were tested by Zurich (Z), Tucson (T) and Libby (L). The column headed "14C Age" provides a raw age before 1950 for each sample tested. This represents the ideal date for the amount of 14C measured for the sample. However, as the quantity of 14 absorbed by all life fluctuates from year to year, the figure must be calibrated based on known fluctuation. This calibrated range of dates is represented in the last column, given with a 2-sigma error rating, which means at 95% confidence. With the exception of the first text from Wadi-ed-Daliyeh, the texts in the table below are only those from the caves around Qumran. The table orders them chronologically, based on 14C age.

Non-scroll material tested:

Many of the date ranges provided are actually two date ranges, for example the Habakkuk Commentary (#13), which is given as 160–148 or 111–2 CE. The section of the calibration curve for the 14C age of the Habakkuk Commentary is complex, so that the 14C age of 2054 cuts through a few spikes on the curve, providing two date ranges.

Observations
The Great Isaiah Scroll 1QIsaa has been tested three times, once by Libby, once at Zurich and once at Tucson. The results from the latter two were almost identical, which is a good indicator of the basic accuracy of this dating method. 1QS (#15), tested at Zurich, and 4QSamc (#8), tested at Tucson, provide overlapping date ranges, which is expected when both texts are attributed to the same scribe. When 4Q258 (#24) was tested at Tucson its result was so anomalous (129–255 or 303–318 CE) that the laboratory was asked to retest another sample from the same document. The second test (#21) yielded a result (50 BCE–130 CE) that was deemed more satisfactory.

See also
 Shrine of the Book

References

Further reading
 Bonani, G., Ivy, S., Wölfli, W., Broshi, M., Carmi, I., and Strugnell, J., "Radiocarbon Dating of Fourteen Dead Sea Scrolls", Radiocarbon 34 (1992) 843–849.
 Broshi, Magen & Eshel, Hanan, 'Radiocarbon dating and "The Messiah before Jesus"', Revue de Qumran 20, 2 (2001) 310–317.
 Carmi, Israel, "Radiocarbon Dating of the Dead Sea Scrolls", in The Dead Sea Scrolls: Fifty Years after their Discovery, 1947–1997, edited by Schiffman, Lawrence H., Tov, Emanuel, and VanderKam, James C. (Jerusalem: Israel Exploration Society & The Shrine of the Book, 2000) 881–888.
 Doudna, Greg, "Dating the Scrolls on the Basis of Radiocarbon Analysis", in The Dead Sea Scrolls after Fifty Years, edited by Flint Peter W., and VanderKam, James C., Vol.1 (Leiden: Brill, 1998) 430–471.
 Jull, A.J.T., Donahue, D.J., Broshi, M., and Tov, Emanuel, "Radiocarbon Dating of Scrolls and Linen Fragments from the Judean Desert", Radiocarbon 37 (1995) 11–19.
 Rasmussen, K.L., van der Plicht, J., Cryer, F.C., Doudna, G., Cross, F.M., and Strugnell, J., "The Effects of Possible Contamination on the Radiocarbon Dating of the Dead Sea Scrolls", Radiocarbon 43, 1 (2001) 127–132.
 Carmi, I., "Are the (super 14) C dates of the Dead Sea Scrolls affected by castor oil contamination?", Radiocarbon 44, 1 (2002) 213–216 (Response to Rasmussen et al. 2001.)
 Rasmussen, K.L., van der Plicht, Doudna, G., Cross, F.M., and Strugnell, J., "Reply to Israel Carmi: 'Are the (super 14) C dates of the Dead Sea Scrolls affected by castor oil contamination?'", Radiocarbon 45, 3 (2003) 497–499. (Reply to Carmi 2002.)
 Atwill, J., Braunheim, S., and Eisenman, R., "Redating the Radiocarbon Dating of the Dead Sea Scrolls", DSD 11, 2 (2004) 143–157.
 van der Plicht, Johannes, "Radiocarbon Dating and the Dead Sea Scrolls: A Comment on 'Redating'", DSD 14, 1 (2007) 77–89. (This is a response to Atwill et al.)
(DSD = Dead Sea Discoveries, Leiden: Brill.)

Dead Sea Scrolls
Dead Sea Scrolls